Hermann Fleissner (16 June 1865, Dresden – 20 April 1939, Berlin) was a German Social Democratic politician.

Before the First World War
After the Volksschule, Fleissner undertook an apprenticeship as a carpenter. He worked as a journeyman until 1895 and then for a short time as an independent carpenter in Pirna. In 1884, Fleissner joined the Social Democratic Party of Germany (SPD), and in 1895 he became a member of the Woodworkers' Association. From 1885 to 1898 he was chairman of the local SPD in Pirna. From 1913 to 1917, Fleissner was a member of the central party committee of the SPD and chairman of the Dresden party organisation. He belonged to the left wing of the party before the war.

Between 1900 and 1903, Fleissner was alderman in Löbtau and 1905-1909 city councillor in Dresden. From 1909 to 1920 he was a member of the Landtag of the Free State of Saxony.

During the First World War and the German Revolution
Fleissner was involved in founding the Independent Social Democratic Party of Germany  (USPD) when it was  established on April 6, 1917 in Gotha. He represented Dresden on the Control Committee. He was the Dresden party chairman until 1921. He also sat temporarily in the central council of the party and served as editor of the party press (Unabhängige Volkszeitung). In 1920 Fleissner belonged to the minority of those who at the extraordinary party congress in Halle , rejected applying for membership of the Communist International. This he did not join the KPD but remained with the USPD until they rejoined the SPD.

In November 1918, during the German Revolution Fleissner was a member of the Council of the People's Deputies of Saxony. On 10 November 1918, Fleissner declared the Republic of Saxony in the premises of the Circus Sarrasani. He joined the cabinet of Richard Lipinski as Minister for Military Affairs. He held this office until 16 January 1919. Between 1920 and 1924 he was Minister of State for National Education.

References

1865 births
1939 deaths
Members of the Landtag of Saxony
Members of the Reichstag of the Weimar Republic
Ministers of the Saxony State Government